Finding Altamira (released as Altamira in Spain) is a 2016 Spanish biographical drama film starring Antonio Banderas, and directed by Hugh Hudson. It is Hudson's first fiction film since I Dreamed of Africa in 2000, and his final film before his death in 2023.

Synopsis
The film chronicles the groundbreaking discovery of stone age cave paintings in the Cave of Altamira in Cantabria, Spain, and the subsequent controversy by leading religious and scientific figures of the day.

Cast

Production
It was shot in Santillana del Mar, Comillas, Puente San Miguel and Santander at the end of 2014.

Soundtrack

The music was composed by guitarist Mark Knopfler and percussionist Evelyn Glennie.

Reception
The film has a score of 57% on Metacritic.

Johnathan Holland of The Hollywood Reporter called the film "picturesque, but routine" and wrote that "little of the wow factor is felt on a first viewing of the Antonio Banderas-starring, Hugh Hudson-directed Finding Altamira, where events which played a footnote role in Darwin's great scientific revolution are reduced to a good-looking but unimaginative period drama in which everything proceeds exactly as expected".

References

External links
 
 

2016 films
2010s English-language films
2010s Spanish-language films
Films with atheism-related themes
2016 biographical drama films
Drama films based on actual events
Spanish biographical drama films
English-language Spanish films
Films shot in Spain
Films directed by Hugh Hudson
Films set in Spain
Films set in the 1870s
2016 drama films
2010s Spanish films